In Search of the Last Good Man is a Canadian comedy-drama short film, directed by Peg Campbell and released in 1989. Cowritten with Peggy Thompson as a follow-up to their 1986 short film It's a Party!, the film blends live action and animation to depict a group of women in a coffee shop talking about their relationships with men.

Campbell described the film as "an experiment in camera movement, using a dolly to create a constant sense of swooping movement."

The film won the Genie Award for Best Live Action Short Drama at the 11th Genie Awards.

References

External links
 

1989 films
1989 comedy-drama films
Canadian comedy-drama films
Best Live Action Short Drama Genie and Canadian Screen Award winners
1980s English-language films
Canadian drama short films
Canadian comedy short films
1980s Canadian films